Patrik Böjte (born 18 June 1993 in Kaposvár) is a Hungarian football player who currently plays for Kaposvári Rákóczi FC.

Club statistics

Updated to games played as of 1 June 2014.

References
Profile at MLSZ 

1993 births
Living people
People from Kaposvár
Hungarian footballers
Association football midfielders
Kaposvári Rákóczi FC players
Nemzeti Bajnokság I players
Sportspeople from Somogy County